No. 16 Group RAF  was a Royal Air Force groups.  It has existed over two periods in to different roles.  First, No. 16 Group was a training group from 1918 to 1920 that had been transferred from the Royal Flying Corps.  Secondly, it was a reconnaissance group formed under RAF Coastal Command in 1936.

With the creation of the RAF as a new service, No. 16 Group was established at Fossgate in York on 1 April 1918.  This was done by re-designating the Royal Flying Corps's Northern Training Brigade as No. 16 Group.  The training role was continued.

RAF Detling was assigned to the group upon the station's opening in 1939.

Air Officers Commanding

References 

016
Military units and formations established in 1918
016
Military units and formations disestablished in 1946
1918 establishments in the United Kingdom